Philoscia is a genus of woodlice in the family Philosciidae. There are more than 80 described species in Philoscia.

Species 
These 81 species belong to the genus Philoscia:

 Philoscia affinis Verhoeff, 1909
 Philoscia algirica Dollfus, 1896
 Philoscia anienana Verhoeff, 1933
 Philoscia australis Richardson Searle, 1914
 Philoscia bermudensis Dahl, 1892
 Philoscia bonariensis Gambiagi de Calabrese, 1935
 Philoscia brevicorpore Wahrberg, 1922
 Philoscia briani Moreira, 1927
 Philoscia buddelundi Searle, 1922
 Philoscia calabrica Strouhal, 1937
 Philoscia camerunica Pualian de Félice, 1940
 Philoscia canalensis Verhoeff, 1926
 Philoscia colimensis Mulaik, 1960
 Philoscia contoyensis Mulaik, 1960
 Philoscia ctenoscioides Mulaik, 1960
 Philoscia dalmatica Verhoeff, 1901
 Philoscia debilis Budde-Lund, 1893
 Philoscia demerarae Van Name, 1925
 Philoscia diminuta Budde-Lund, 1893
 Philoscia dobakholi Chopra, 1924
 Philoscia dongarrensis Wahrberg, 1922
 Philoscia ehrenbergii Brandt, 1833
 Philoscia elephantina Paulian de Félice, 1940
 Philoscia faucium Verhoeff, 1918
 Philoscia flava Budde-Lund, 1913
 Philoscia formosa Mulaik, 1960
 Philoscia formosana Verhoeff
 Philoscia fulva Barnard, 1932
 Philoscia geayi Paulian de Felice, 1944
 Philoscia geiseri Van Name, 1936
 Philoscia gracilior Paulian de Felice, 1944
 Philoscia guerrerense Mulaik, 1960
 Philoscia guerrerensis Mulaik, 1960
 Philoscia guttata Wahrberg, 1922
 Philoscia heroldi Verhoeff, 1936
 Philoscia hirta Wahrberg, 1922
 Philoscia humboldtii Verhoeff, 1926
 Philoscia incerta Arcangeli, 1932
 Philoscia incurva Budde-Lund, 1902
 Philoscia inquilina Van Name, 1936
 Philoscia jacobsoni Searle, 1922
 Philoscia javanensis Searle
 Philoscia karrakattensis Wahrberg, 1922
 Philoscia kartaboana Van Name, 1936
 Philoscia lata Paulian de Félice, 1940
 Philoscia lifuensis Stebbing, 1900
 Philoscia lodnensis Ramakrishna, 1969
 Philoscia longicaudata Wahrberg, 1922
 Philoscia lubricata Budde-Lund, 1894
 Philoscia marmorata Brandt, 1833
 Philoscia mattereusis
 Philoscia maxima Wahrberg, 1922
 Philoscia mendica Budde-Lund, 1898
 Philoscia minutissima Boone, 1918
 Philoscia molisia Verhoeff, 1933
 Philoscia moneaguensis Van Name, 1936
 Philoscia monticola Verhoeff, 1926
 Philoscia muscorum (Scopoli, 1763) (common striped woodlouse)
 Philoscia myrmecophila Wahrberg, 1922
 Philoscia nebulosa Paulian de Felice, 1940
 Philoscia novaezealandiae Filhol, 1885
 Philoscia novaezelandiae Filhol, 1885
 Philoscia paniensis Verhoeff, 1926
 Philoscia pannonica Verhoeff, 1909
 Philoscia perlata Wahrberg, 1922
 Philoscia persona Jackson, 1938
 Philoscia pubescens (Dana, 1853)
 Philoscia robusta Schultz
 Philoscia roraimae Van Name, 1936
 Philoscia sacchari David, 1967
 Philoscia salina Baker, 1926
 Philoscia sassandrai Paulian de Félice, 1940
 Philoscia seriepunctata Budde-Lund, 1893
 Philoscia simplex Verhoeff, 1951
 Philoscia squamosa Jackson, 1938
 Philoscia squamuligera Koelbel, 1895
 Philoscia tenuissima Collinge, 1915
 Philoscia truncatella Budde-Lund, 1902
 Philoscia univittata Strouhal, 1937
 Philoscia veracruzana Mulaik, 1960
 Philoscia weberi Dollfus, 1907

References 

Woodlice